The Međimurje Party ( or MS) is a regional political party in Croatia, formed in Međimurje in 2000. It is usually aligned with right-wing parties.

At the last legislative elections, 23 November 2003, an alliance of the Croatian Party of Rights (Hrvatska stranka prava), the Međimurje Party and the Zagorje Democratic Party - won 6.4% of the popular vote and 8 out of 151 seats, all for the HSP.

Electoral history

Legislative

References

Regionalist parties in Croatia
Political parties established in 2000
2000 establishments in Croatia
Right-wing parties in Europe